James Andrew Himes (born July 5, 1966) is an American businessman and politician serving as the U.S. representative for  since 2009. A member of the Democratic Party, he chaired the New Democrat Coalition in the 115th Congress (2017–2019).

Himes's district includes most of the southwestern corner of the state and is largely coextensive with the Connecticut side of the New York metropolitan area. It includes parts of Fairfield County and New Haven County, including the cities of Bridgeport, Norwalk, Fairfield and Stamford.

Himes is the ranking member of the House Permanent Select Committee on Intelligence, and is a member of the House Financial Services Committee. 

He previously chaired the United States House Select Committee on Economic Disparity and Fairness in Growth and the National Security, International Development and Monetary Policy Subcommittee of the House Financial Services Committee, and has been a member of the House Permanent Select Committee on Intelligence since 2013. In 2023, Himes became the Ranking Member on the House Permanent Select Committee on Intelligence.

Early life and education
Himes was born on July 5, 1966, in Lima, Peru, to American parents. His father, James R. Himes, worked for the Ford Foundation in Lima. His father was also the director of the UNICEF Innocenti Center, a research institute on child development in Florence, Italy. His mother, Judith A. Himes, was until recently the director of board activities for the New Jersey Board of Higher Education in Trenton.

Himes spent his early childhood in Lima and Bogotá, Colombia. After his parents divorced, Jim, his mother, and his two sisters moved to Pennington, New Jersey, where he attended and graduated from Hopewell Valley Central High School.

Himes attended Harvard College, where he was the captain of the lightweight crew and graduated with a Bachelor of Arts in 1988. He studied for a degree in Latin American studies as a Rhodes scholar at St Edmund Hall, Oxford and graduated with a Master of Philosophy in 1990. He was awarded an honorary Doctor of Humane Letters degree from the University of Bridgeport on May 5, 2012.

Early career

In 1995, Himes began working at Goldman Sachs as a banker in Latin America and New York. He was eventually promoted to vice president.

Himes was appointed commissioner of the Greenwich Housing Authority in 2002, and served for two years as chairman of the board. He has also served as a board member of Aspira of Connecticut in Bridgeport, a board member of the Fairfield County Community Foundation, and as an advisory board member of Family Assets, LLP of Bridgeport.

Himes was also an elected member of the Greenwich Board of Estimate and Taxation and chaired the Greenwich Democratic Town Committee.

U.S. House of Representatives

Legislation
Himes has sponsored 75 bills.

Political positions

Abortion
Planned Parenthood gives Himes a 100% pro-choice rating. He voted against the Stupak-Pitts Amendment in the Affordable Health Care for America Act that was intended to prevent any federal funds from paying for any health care plan with abortion coverage.

Defense
Himes has said, "we should reduce our presence in Afghanistan as rapidly as possible and reshape our mission to focus exclusively on counterterrorism" while requiring "presence in the region, but one considerably smaller than that required by our present strategy of nation-building." He believes in a world free of nuclear weapons, and readily supports sanctions against Iran. He voted for the Comprehensive Iran Sanctions, Accountability, and Divestment Act of 2010. He supports a two-state solution for Israel and Palestine.

Education
Himes believes that early childhood education is "the most intelligent investment a nation can make in its future" and voted to double funding for Early Head Start Program. He stated in 2008 that No Child Left Behind "is well-intentioned because it focuses on education, but it must be reformed." Himes also co-authored an amendment to the Student Aid and Fiscal Responsibility Act that promoted students' financial literacy.

Environment
Environment America has given Himes a 100% rating. He believes that "By creating the right set of financial incentives and supporting a broad range of research and development, we can deliver the energy our economy requires to thrive while protecting our planet." He also voted for the American Clean Energy and Security Act.

Gun issues
Himes voted against H.R. 627 which allowed loaded guns into national parks. The Brady Campaign to Prevent Gun Violence gives him a 100% lifetime score for his support of more gun regulations. Himes refuses to participate in moments of silence in the House chamber after mass shootings. He believes this honorary gesture for shooting victims is a negligence by Congress, because they could spend the time passing legislation to work on ending gun violence.

Health care
Himes supports the Patient Protection and Affordable Care Act. He believes in preserving Medicare and Medicaid and says we must be "prepared to equitably reform these programs to address the challenging problem of rising health care costs and ensure that these important safety net programs are here to help this generation and the next."

Fourth Amendment
Himes voted against H.R. 2397, which was to defund the NSA domestic phone metadata spying program. He said he voted against the bill not because he objects to limiting the NSA's power, but because the bill was created in a reactionary manner and stripped the NSA of too much power.

Transportation
Himes co-sponsored H.R. 402, The National Infrastructure Development Bank Act of 2011, which would objectively fund national infrastructure projects. According to Himes, it would also "attract private investment and facilitate private sector partnering with regions, states and localities to borrow from the Bank while adding its own private equity to projects." He has helped bring money to the 4th district, such as "over $70 million for safety improvements, resurfacing, enhancements, and bridge improvements to the Merritt Parkway; over $11 million for infrastructure improvements at the Steel Point project in Bridgeport that will generate thousands of new jobs; and $30 million for upgrades to Metro North's Danbury Branch line."

Animal rights and wildlife issues
In 2009–2010, the Society for Animal Protective legislation gave Himes a rating of 100% for his support of animal protection. In 2009, Himes received a 100% rating from the Defenders of Wildlife Action Fund for his position on wildlife action.

LGBT rights
In 2009–2010, the Human Rights Campaign gave Himes a rating of 100%.

Immigration
In 2009–2010, the American Immigration Lawyers Association gave Himes a rating of 100% for his stance on the defense of undocumented immigrants in the U.S.

Electoral College and presidential selection
In 2016, Himes lobbied the Electoral College to refuse to vote for Donald Trump and to instead elect Hillary Clinton. On December 12, 2016, in an interview on CNN's New Day, he said he was troubled by several of Trump's actions. The issue that "pushed me over the edge" was Trump's criticism of the CIA and the intelligence community. Himes admitted that Trump won "fair and square" but said that Trump had proved himself unfit for public office. He cited the intentions behind the creation of the electoral college and argued that it was created for an instance such as Trump's election.

Antitrust legislation
In 2022, Himes was one of 16 Democrats to vote against the Merger Filing Fee Modernization Act of 2022, an antitrust package that would crack down on corporations for anti-competitive behavior.

Political campaigns

2008

Himes faced the ten-term Republican incumbent Chris Shays in the 2008 congressional election, along with Libertarian nominee M.A. Carrano, a professional philosophy writer and systems consultant, and Green Party nominee Richard Duffee. Himes defeated Shays, 51% to 47%. While Shays won 14 of the district's 17 towns, Himes won all three of the district's large cities—Bridgeport, Norwalk and Stamford. Ultimately, he owed his victory to swamping Shays in Bridgeport, winning 80% of the vote there. He was also helped by Barack Obama's massive win in that district; Obama carried the 4th with 60% of the vote, one of his largest margins in a Republican-held district.

Himes took office in the 111th United States Congress on January 6, 2009. He is the first Democrat to represent the district since Donald J. Irwin left office in 1969, and only the second since 1943. Shays was the sole Republican congressman from New England, and Himes's win made New England's House delegation entirely Democratic for the first time in history.

2010

In the 2010 election, Himes won reelection against Republican challenger State Senator Dan Debicella. Along with the three towns that he won in 2008, Himes also won Redding, Weston, and Westport, and won Fairfield by nine votes.

The campaign raised $3,660,498, $3,603,727 of which was spent. Only 4% of that came from small individual donors, while 60% came from large individual donors. The remaining donations came mostly from Political Action Committees (34%). Himes did not self-finance at all. The majority of his money, 74%, came from in-state. Only 26% came from out of state. Himes disclosed 97.9% of his donations.

2012 

Himes was reelected, defeating Steve Obsitnik, 60% to 40%.

2014 

Himes defeated Dan Debicella with 53.8% of the vote to Debicella’s 46.2%.

2016

Himes defeated John Shaban with 59.9% of the vote to Shaban's 40.1%.

2018 

Himes defeated Republican nominee Harry Arora, 61.2% to 38.8%.

2020 

With 61.2% of the vote, Himes defeated Jonathan Riddle, Brian Merlen, and Yusheng Peng.

2022 

Himes defeated Jayme Stevenson, 59.4% to 40.6%.

Personal life
On October 15, 1994, Himes married Mary Linley Scott, a designer. They live in the Cos Cob section of Greenwich with their two daughters.

See also
 Enterprise Community Partners

References

External links

 Congressman Jim Himes official U.S. House website
 Jim Himes for Congress
 

 

|-

|-

|-

1966 births
21st-century American politicians
Alumni of St Edmund Hall, Oxford
American Presbyterians
American Rhodes Scholars
Democratic Party members of the United States House of Representatives from Connecticut
Goldman Sachs people
Harvard University alumni
Hopewell Valley Central High School alumni
Living people
People from Cos Cob, Connecticut
People from Pennington, New Jersey
American gun control activists